John Ward (23 January 1928 – 10 May 2017) was an Australian rules footballer who played with Essendon in the Victorian Football League (VFL).

Notes

External links 		

Essendon Football Club past player profile
		
		
		
		
2017 deaths
1928 births
Australian rules footballers from Victoria (Australia)
Essendon Football Club players